Margaret D. Strachan (born 1935) is an American politician who served on the Portland City Council, in Portland, Oregon, from 1981–1986. She was the first woman elected (not appointed) to the Council.

Early life and education
She was born Margaret Darcy in Helena, Montana. She graduated from Carroll College with a degree in English and became a high-school teacher. She taught in Montana for three years until she moved to Portland in 1973.

Activism and political career
She worked as a neighborhood activist, including as a coordinator for the City of Portland's Office of Neighborhood Associations and later on the staff of Commissioner Mike Lindberg as a liaison to neighborhood organizations. She was the campaign manager for Charles Jordan's first run for election to the city council, in 1974, after Jordan was initially appointed to the council.

She was elected to the Portland City Council in March 1981, and was sworn-in on April 9, 1981. Her 1981 election was to a partial term only, to fill a vacancy on the council created in November 1980 as a result of Frank Ivancie's succeeding Connie McCready as mayor, but she won re-election in May 1982.

She ran for re-election again in 1986, but lost to Bob Koch and her time on the council ended at the end of 1986.
She was instrumental in the redevelopment of the Pearl District from an industrial district to a high-end neighborhood. During her term she was also involved in developing the Central City Plan and building public housing along the Park Blocks.

In 1988, she became the Executive Director of Central City Concern, a Portland non-profit that provides resources to homeless people. She left the organization a year later, in March 1989.

Personal life
Margaret Darcy married Jim Strachan in 1954, at age 19, and became Margaret Strachan. They divorced before she moved to Portland. In Oregon, she married Sumner Sharpe. She is currently retired and living in Montana.

References 

1935 births
Portland City Council members (Oregon)
Carroll College (Montana) alumni
Politicians from Helena, Montana
Living people
Women city councillors in Oregon
21st-century American women